Nanak Shah Fakir is a 2015 Indian Punjabi-language biographical film based on the life of Guru Nanak, and produced by Gurbani Media Pvt. Ltd. It was theatrically released on 17 April 2015.

It won the awards for Best Feature Film on National Integration, Best Costume Design and Best Make-up Artist at the 63rd National Film Awards.

The film was mired in controversies with protests from Sikh groups asking for a ban on the film as it was claimed to depict Sikh figures through actors, which they said violated Sikh tenets.

Cast 
 Arif Zakaria as Bhai Mardana, narrator
 Puneet Sikka as Bebe Nanaki
 Adil Hussain as Rai Bular Bhatti
 Shraddha Kaul as Mata Tripta
 Anurag Arora as Kalu Mehta

Score 
Original score by Tuomas Kantelinen, with music by Uttam Singh and sound design by Resul Pookutty.

Controversy
The supreme Sikh body, Akal Takht announced a ban on the film, as it was claimed to depict Guru Nanak and other prominent Sikh figures (Bebe Nanaki, Bhai Mardana) through human actors, which it said violated Sikh tenets. A related resolution adopted by the SGPC in 2003 had prohibited human actors from playing the roles of Sikh Gurus or their family members.

The Government of Punjab decided against allowing the release of the film. The film producers Resul Pookutty and Gurbani Media also appealed to the Supreme Court of India to allow for the release of the film. The Supreme court cleared the film for release, citing the certification provided by India's Central Board for Film Certification.

Awards 
National Film Award
 Best Feature Film on National Integration – Director Sartaj Singh Pannu
 Best Costume Design – Payal Saluja
 Best Make-up Artist – Preetisheel Singh D'Souza and Clover Wootton

References

External links 
 
 Nanak Shah Fakir-- A Film, A Journey. The Citizen.

2015 films
Films about Sikhism
Indian biographical films
Cultural depictions of Sikh gurus
Punjabi-language Indian films
2010s Punjabi-language films
2010s biographical films